In computing, rubberhose (also known by its development codename Marutukku) is a deniable encryption archive containing multiple file systems whose existence can only be verified using the appropriate cryptographic key.

Name and history 
The project was originally named Rubberhose, as it was designed to be resistant to attacks by people willing to use torture on those who knew the encryption keys. This is a reference to the rubber-hose cryptanalysis euphemism.

It was written in 1997–2000 by Julian Assange, Suelette Dreyfus, and Ralf Weinmann.

Technical
The following paragraphs are extracts from the project's documentation:

Status 
Rubberhose is not actively maintained, although it is available for Linux kernel 2.2, NetBSD and FreeBSD. The latest version available, still in alpha stage, is v0.8.3.

See also 

Rubber-hose cryptanalysis
Key disclosure law
StegFS
VeraCrypt hidden volumes

References

External links

Marutukku.org documentation and downloads 

Cryptographic software
Julian Assange
Steganography